John Sparks is an American politician and former Oklahoma Senator who represented District 16, which includes portions of Cleveland and McClain counties, from 2006 to 2018. Sparks made headlines in late 2009 when he proposed a Second Amendment Weekend that would make handguns and rifles tax free.

Sparks received an AB from Harvard College in 1991, and a JD from the University of Oklahoma College of Law in 1994.

Electoral history

Sparks was unopposed in both the primary and general elections in 2014.

External links
Senator John Sparks - District 16 official State Senate website
John Sparks for Senate official campaign website
Project Vote Smart - John Sparks (OK) profile
Follow the Money - John Sparks
2008 2006 campaign contributions

References

21st-century American politicians
21st-century Native American politicians
Cherokee Nation politicians
Harvard University alumni
Living people
Cherokee Nation state legislators in Oklahoma
Democratic Party Oklahoma state senators
People from Norman, Oklahoma
University of Oklahoma College of Law alumni
Year of birth missing (living people)